Lotte Friis (born 9 February 1988) is a Danish competitive swimmer from Allerød Municipality.

Career
Friis was born in Blovstrød.  Finishing third in the 1500 metre freestyle competition at the European Championships 2008 in Eindhoven she won her first major long course medal. At the 2008 Summer Olympics in Beijing, she won bronze in the 800 metre freestyle competition. At the 2009 World Championships she won silver in the 1500 metre freestyle competition and gold in the 800 metre freestyle competition with the second fastest time ever and a new championship record. At the 2011 World Aquatics Championships in Shanghai Friis won gold in the women's 1500 metre freestyle in the time 15:49.59 and silver in the women's 800 metre freestyle. Friis participated in the women's 400 metre freestyle and reached the final. She finished in fifth in a time of 4:04.68, which was a new Nordic record.

See also
World record progression 1500 metres freestyle

References

1988 births
Living people
People from Allerød Municipality
Danish female freestyle swimmers
Olympic swimmers of Denmark
Swimmers at the 2008 Summer Olympics
Swimmers at the 2012 Summer Olympics
Swimmers at the 2016 Summer Olympics
Olympic bronze medalists for Denmark
World record setters in swimming
Olympic bronze medalists in swimming
World Aquatics Championships medalists in swimming
Medalists at the FINA World Swimming Championships (25 m)
European Aquatics Championships medalists in swimming
Medalists at the 2008 Summer Olympics
Sportspeople from the Capital Region of Denmark